Robert Sawyer may refer to:

People
Sir Robert Sawyer (Attorney General) (1633–1692), Attorney General for England and Wales and Speaker of the English House of Commons
Robert J. Sawyer (born 1960), Canadian science fiction writer
Robert William Sawyer (1880–1959), Oregon politician and conservationist
Robert Sawyer (murderer) (died 1993), murderer executed in Louisiana
Robert Earl Sawyer (1923–1994), African-American playwright, director and actor
Robert Sawyer (American football) (born 1962), American football punter
R. Tom Sawyer (1901–1986), inventor of the gas turbine locomotive
Bob Sawyer, Iron Maiden band member

Fictional characters
Chop Top, real name "Robert Sawyer", a villain from The Texas Chainsaw Massacre franchise